Bayyarat Hannun was a Palestinian Arab village in the Tulkarm Subdistrict in Mandatory Palestine. It was depopulated during "Operation Coastal Clearing" on March 31, 1948, in the 1947–48 Civil War in Mandatory Palestine. It was located 16 km west of Tulkarm.

Geography
Bayyarat Hannun was located on a small elevation, just north of an artificial pond. The most notable landmark was one large house, part of which was still standing in 1992.

History
The first part of the name Bayyara, meaning "orchard", indicates that the village may have been established during the citrus boom in the area in the 1880s.

The village was noted as a hamlet in the Palestine Index Gazetteer.

In  the 1931 census of Palestine it was counted with nearby Ghabat Kafr Sur and 'Arab el Balawina, together they had a population of 559; 6 Christians and 553 Muslims, in a total of 128 houses.

Aftermath of the 1947–48 Civil War in Mandatory Palestine

The village became depopulated in early April 1948, during Operation Coastal Clearing carried out by Haganah. Benny Morris provided "fear of being caught up in the fighting" and "Expulsion by  Yishuv forces" as reasons for depopulation, while Rosemarie Esber noted "on-site massacre, atrocities, rape, expulsion by Zionist forces" as reason for depopulation.

By 1992, the southern part of Netanya had expanded within 500 meters from the village site.

References

Bibliography

External links
Welcome To Bayyarat Hannun
Bayyarat Hannun, Zochrot
Survey of Western Palestine, Map 10:    IAA, Wikimedia commons

Arab villages depopulated during the 1948 Arab–Israeli War
District of Tulkarm